Richard Owen Holmes Montgomery (born April 3, 1993) is an American singer, musician and songwriter. In 2020, his songs went viral on TikTok, leading to being signed with Warner Records later that year.

Early life 
Ricky Montgomery was born in Los Angeles. His mother was a teacher, and his father was a gaffer. When Montgomery was young, his parents got a divorce, and, in 2005, he and his mother moved to St. Louis, Missouri. At the age of 14, he began to play in various bands. In 2014, he gained a following on Vine, a short-form video service, posting comical original songs. He found the site the day after the app had launched from a CNN news article. He saw the site as a potential "springboard for a possible music career." After finding success with Vine, Montgomery released his first EP, Caught On The Moon. Soon after, he dropped out of college and returned to Los Angeles to pursue a musical career.

He has a sister. His pronouns are he/they.

Career 
In LA, he released his first studio album Montgomery Ricky on April 1, 2016. Montgomery founded indie band The Honeysticks with a childhood friend of his to experiment musically. The band name was derived from a snack Montgomery ate every Saturday morning when he was a kid, made of sticks of honey. In 2018, he took the year off from making music and started social media marketing companies to earn more money. By 2020, he considered quitting making music entirely. However, in mid-2020, during the COVID-19 pandemic, his two singles—"Mr Loverman" and "Line Without A Hook"—went viral on TikTok. With his explosion in popularity, he was contacted by "virtually every single major label A&R in a matter of months." In December 2020, after a large bidding war, Montgomery signed with Warner Records.

Since then, he has remixed two songs in 2021 from his debut album with fellow artists Chloe Moriondo and mxmtoon respectively. Montgomery came in contact with mxmtoon after finding her perform one of his songs on the streaming platform Twitch, learning that she had been a fan of his Vine content before it shut down. He found Moriondo from a song cover of "Out Like A Light".

Montgomery released his second solo EP, It’s 2016 Somewhere, on April 15, 2022. Upon announcement of the EP’s title, Montgomery hinted at more content being released in the near future.

Discography

EPs 

 Caught On The Moon (2014)
 It's 2016 Somewhere (2022)

Singles 

 "Out Like A Light" (2017)
 "Line Without A Hook" (2021), RIAA: Platinum, MC: Platinum
 "Mr Loverman" (2021), BPI: Silver, RIAA: Platinum, MC: Platinum
 "Talk To You" (2021)
 "Sorry for Me" (2021)

Montgomery Ricky (2016)

It's 2016 Somewhere (2022)

Notes

References 

Musicians from Los Angeles
1993 births
American TikTokers
Warner Records artists
Bedroom pop musicians
American indie pop musicians
Vine (service) celebrities
Living people
American male musicians
21st-century American male musicians
American male singer-songwriters
Singer-songwriters from California